Jorge Juan y Santacilia (Novelda, Alicante, 5 January 1713 – Madrid, 21 June 1773) was a Spanish mathematician, scientist, naval officer, and mariner. He determined that the Earth is not perfectly spherical but is oblate, i.e. flattened at the poles. Juan also successfully measured the heights of the mountains of the Andes using a barometer.

Family and education
Jorge Juan was born on the estate El Fondonet, the property of his grandfather don Cipriano Juan Vergara in Novelda, Alicante, Spain. He was baptised in the Church at Monforte del Cid. Juan was born of two distinguished families:  his father was don Bernardo Juan y Canicia who came from the branch of the Counts of Peñalba, and his mother was doña Violante Santacilia y Soler de Cornellá, who came from prominent land-owning family in Elche. Both of his parents were widowed and remarried. They lived in their house on the Plaza del Mar in Alicante and only vacationed in Novelda.

His father died when Juan was only three years old and he grew under the care of the Jesuits of the Jesuit school in Alicante. His uncle don Antonio Juan, a Canon at the Collegiate Church took charge of young Jorge and continued his education. Later another uncle, don Cipriano Juan, a Knight of the Order of Malta, took charge of his education and sent him to Zaragoza for a preparatory education for higher studies.

At the age of 12, he was sent to Malta to receive Holy Orders at the Order of Malta. The next year he became page to the Grand Master don Antonio Manuel de Villena, who granted him the title of Commander of Aliaga in Aragón. Thus, he received his first title when he was only 14. Soon, he became a Knight of the Order of Malta, which implied lifelong celibacy.

In 1729, when he was 16, he returned to Spain and applied for entry to the Royal Company of Marine Guards, the Spanish military school for naval officers. He entered the academy in 1730 and studied modern technical and scientific studies subjects such as geometry, trigonometry, astronomy, navigation, hydrography, and cartography. He also completed his education in the humanities with classes in drawing, music, and dancing. He earned the reputation of being an outstanding student and his fellow students called him Euclid. He finished his studies at the academy in 1734. At the young age of 22, he was given command of a corvette and he participated in the expedition against Oran and the campaign of Naples.

Career
In 1734, King Philip V of Spain asked Jorge Juan and fellow scientist Antonio de Ulloa to join the French Geodesic Mission organized by the French Academy of Sciences from Paris, under command of the astronomer Louis Godin, and fellow geographers Charles Marie de La Condamine and Pierre Bouguer. The mission was to measure the length of a degree of meridian arc at the Equator in South America and to determine the roundness of the Earth. On 26 May 1735, they left Cadiz in the company of the Marquess of Villagarcía, who had just been appointed Viceroy of Peru. Jorge Juan was on board the ship El Conquistador and Antonio de Ulloa on the frigate Incendio. The expedition traveled to Quito, in present-day Ecuador, and after nine years of careful study, determined that the Earth is not perfectly spherical but is oblate, i.e. flattened at the poles. Juan also successfully measured the heights of the mountains of the Andes using a barometer.

Juan remained nine years in America, studying the political and social situation of the Spanish territories. Among other things, he observed a new metal the miners called Platina de Pinto (little silver of the Pinto river). On his return to Spain, King Ferdinand promoted him to captain. For their work and discoveries in Peru, both he and de Ulloa were elected Fellows of the Royal Society, Juan y Santacilia in 1749.

The Marques de la Ensenada ordered Juan to travel to England secretly to study new naval construction methods and armament of the British. In 1749, he travelled incognito under the name of Mr. Josues and learned all that he could in England (writing back in a numerical cipher), and brought back 50 British naval constructors. In an ironic twist, many of them (including Matthew Mullan and Richard Rooth) went on to build the Spanish ships that would later fight in the American Revolutionary War and the battle of Trafalgar.  He was, however, disappointed with the English naval construction methods and upon his return to Spain in 1750, he was placed in charge of Spanish naval construction, creating his own naval construction system (approved in 1752) and improving the shipyards (such as the ones in Cartagena, Cádiz, Ferrol, Havana) and armaments. He implemented modern industrial division of labor among the different disciplines involved in naval construction such as dry-docks, shipyards, furnaces, rigging, and canvas manufacturing.

In 1757, he founded the Royal Astronomical Observatory of Madrid (Real Observatorio de Madrid).

He died in Madrid in 1773 at the age of 60.  His reported symptoms, including muscle stiffness and seizures, were almost certainly the result of a cerebral amebic infection. He was buried in the church of San Martín.

A Churruca-class destroyer of the Spanish Navy, the Jorge Juan, was named after him.

Works

 
 Compendio de navegación (1757)
 Examen marítimo teórico-práctico (1771)
 Estado de la astronomía en Europa (1774)

In collaboration with Antonio de Ulloa

 Plan del camino de Quito al río Esmeraldas, según las observaciones astronómicas de Jorge Juan y Antonio de Ulloa (1736–1742)
 Observaciones astronómicas y físicas hechas en los Reinos del Perú (Madrid, 1748)
 Relación histórica del viaje hecho de orden de su Majestad a la América Meridional (Madrid, 1748)
 Disertación Histórica y Geográfica sobre el Meridiano de Demarcación entre los dominios de España y Portugal (1749)
 Noticias Secretas de América, sobre el estado naval, militar y político del Perú y provincia de Quito (The Secret news of America, on the naval state, military and political of the Peru and province of Quito) (1748) (published in London 1826 after publication was banned by the Spanish government)

Sources
Biography – Spanish Wikipedia
Biography – Jorge Juan Foundation
 Ferreiro, Larrie: Measure of the Earth: The Enlightenment Expedition that Reshaped Our World (New York: Basic Books, 2011)  
Jorge Juan. Polymath Virtual Library, Fundación Ignacio Larramendi

External links 

|Antonio de Ulloa y Jorge Juan Santacilia, Cervantes Virtual

1713 births
1773 deaths
People from Vinalopó Mitjà
Spanish geodesists
18th-century Spanish astronomers
Spanish explorers
Fellows of the Royal Society
Spanish naval officers
Spanish spies
Spanish cryptographers
18th-century Spanish mathematicians